Kong Island (original Italian title: Eva, la Venere selvaggia; translated as Eva, the Savage Venus) is a 1968 jungle adventure film (with a science fiction element) directed by Roberto Mauri (billed as Robert Morris). The film was promoted in the U.S. as King of Kong Island.

Plot synopsis

The story takes place in the jungles of Kenya and its capital city Nairobi. Despite the English-language title, there is no island (and no "Kong"). Mad scientist Albert Muller is experimenting with small radio transmitters implanted in the brains of gorillas that control their minds. These are test subjects with the ultimate goal of doing this to humans.

Diana, the daughter of bar owner Theodore (no last name is mentioned), is abducted by apes under Muller's control during a safari. A rescue team led by mercenary adventurer Burt Dawson (Brad Harris) heads into the jungle to find her. Hostile natives attack his group, and Burt is captured along the way. After he escapes, Burt meets a legendary white jungle girl the natives call the Sacred Monkey (In the English dubbed version, he first calls her Eve, but later everyone refers to her as Eva).

Eva is a Tarzan-like orphan who grew up alone in the jungle. She wears only a leather loincloth, and her waist-length black hair covers her breasts. She does not speak English but can communicate with animals and has a pet chimpanzee. She has one of Diana's bracelets and eventually leads Burt to a cave where she is being held prisoner by Muller. This is where the final conflict and resolution takes place.

Unlike virtually every other film which features a jungle girl character, this story concentrates on Burt and his love interest Diana, with Eva confined to a marginal supporting role.

Cast
 Brad Harris as Burt Dawson
 Esmeralda Barros as Eve
 Marc Lawrence as Albert Muller
 Ursula Davis as Diana
 Adriana Alben as Ursula
 Marc Fiorini (credited as Mark Farran) as Robert
 Aldo Cecconi as Theodore
 Paolo Magalotti as Peter
 Mario Donatone as Forrester
 Gianni Pulone

Legacy
Contrary to popular belief, this film has nothing to do with King Kong and does not take place on an island. The film is in the public domain.

See also
 List of films in the public domain in the United States

References

External links
 Eva, la Venere selvaggia (1968) at DBCult Film Institute
 
 

1968 films
1960s science fiction adventure films
1960s Italian-language films
Films directed by Roberto Mauri
Films set in Kenya
Mad scientist films
Films about apes
1960s exploitation films
Jungle girls
Italian science fiction adventure films
Films scored by Roberto Pregadio
1960s Italian films